The Griswold Inn is located in Essex, Connecticut and is one of the oldest continuously run Inns in the United States. It was founded by three brothers in the late 18th century and named after the Griswold Family of the area, and it has been under the stewardship of only six families. The inn was captured by British troops and used as a base of operations during the War of 1812. During Prohibition, it still maintained a lively entertainment schedule for the local yachtsmen. Over the years, several surrounding buildings were added to the inn complex, each with its own unique history. It was also used as a filming location for the gothic soap opera Dark Shadows.

Historical displays

The walls of the inn hold numerous historic artifacts. Paintings are prominently displayed of famous vessels from the age of sail and steam, and the Gun Room has a collection of rare firearms. The inn has the largest privately held collection of the works of Antonio Jacobsen, the country's most prolific painter of maritime art.

Amenities
The tavern serves New England cuisine. It serves lunch and dinner on most days. and it features a special Hunt Breakfast on Sundays, a convention which has existed for approximately two hundred years. The Tap Room was built in 1735 as a schoolhouse, but today it offers drinks and casual food as well as live entertainment.

The rooms are all well-furnished with local antiques, and the bathrooms are modern. None of the rooms have televisions; instead, classical music is piped in.

The inn is situated close to the mouth of the Connecticut River, and the typical live music leans toward sea shanties and working-class songs. During the holiday season, quartets of madrigals perform historical carols, while parlor magicians, storytellers, and local crafts are all showcased at various times of the year.

Cultural references
The Griswold Inn served as the exterior for the Collinsport Inn in the original Dark Shadows TV series.

See also
 List of the oldest restaurants in the United States

References

External links

 Griswold Inn site

Essex, Connecticut
Tourist attractions in Middlesex County, Connecticut
Hotels in Connecticut
Drinking establishments in Connecticut
Buildings and structures in Middlesex County, Connecticut
Dark Shadows
English-American culture in Connecticut